was a daimyō and a monk during the Sengoku period in Japan. Myōchin was the son of Saitō Sōen (斎藤宗円), who served as the guardian of Mino Province, and the younger brother of Saitō Toshinaga. He began his training as a monk from a young age at Zene-ji (善恵寺). His grave is on the grounds of Zuiryū-ji in Gifu, Gifu Prefecture.

History
In 1450, Saitō Myōchin served as the guardian of upper Mino Province on behalf of the Toki clan. During his reign, he built Jōzai-ji in modern-day Gifu. The temple would later become the family temple for the Saitō clan. When Yoshinaga died in 1460, Myōchin moved from Jōzai-ji and into nearby Kanō Castle.

References

1411 births
1480 deaths
Daimyo
Myochin